Jean-Luc Warsmann (born October 22, 1965 in Villers-Semeuse, Ardennes) is a French politician of the Republicans who has been serving as a member of the National Assembly of France, representing the Ardennes department.

Political career
In parliament, Warsmann has been serving on the Committee on Legal Affairs since 1995. 

From 2005 until 2007, Warsmann served as vice-president of the National Assembly, under the leadership of president Jean-Louis Debré. 

Following the 2007 French legislative election, Warsmann succeeded Philippe Houillon as chairman of the Committee on Legal Affairs. In this capacity, he was the parliament's rapporteur on the French constitutional law of 23 July 2008. In 2009, Warsmann introduced a bill according to which the Church of Scientology cannot be dissolved in France even if it is convicted of fraud; the change in the relevant law made the maximum penalty for fraud committed by an organisation a ban on its activities in France. Also in 2009, the committee adopted a proposal made by Warsmann which provides for financial sanctions against any deputy who is absent from committee sessions more than once a month without justification. By 2012, Warsmann was replaced by Jean-Jacques Urvoas.

From 2007 until 2017, Warsmann was as one of twelve parliamentarians who served as judge on the Cour de Justice de la République. 

In addition to his committee assignments, Warsmann is part of the French-German Parliamentary Friendship Group and the French-Luxembourg Parliamentary Friendship Group. 

Since 2020, Warsmann has been part of the UDI and Independents group.

References

1965 births
Living people
People from Ardennes (department)
Rally for the Republic politicians
Union for a Popular Movement politicians
United Republic politicians
The Republicans (France) politicians
Deputies of the 15th National Assembly of the French Fifth Republic
Deputies of the 11th National Assembly of the French Fifth Republic
Deputies of the 12th National Assembly of the French Fifth Republic
Deputies of the 13th National Assembly of the French Fifth Republic
Deputies of the 14th National Assembly of the French Fifth Republic
Regional councillors of Grand Est
Deputies of the 16th National Assembly of the French Fifth Republic
Members of Parliament for Ardennes